Disney's Hilton Head Island Resort is a Disney Vacation Club Resort and vacation rental accommodation located in Hilton Head Island, South Carolina. It opened on March 1, 1996 as part of the Disney brand of timeshares.

Resort 
Opened on March 1, 1996, the Hilton Island Resort is the third phase of the Disney Vacation Club Resort. Designed by the architecture firm Cooper and Robertson, the property is on Hilton Head's Broad Creek, a landlocked tidal marsh on South Carolina's coast.

It has two eating spots and a rustic-themed resort.

Gallery

References

External links
 Disney's Hilton Head Island Resort - Disney Vacation Club
 Disney's Hilton Head Island Resort - Discover South Carolina

1996 establishments in South Carolina
Buildings and structures in Beaufort County, South Carolina
Hilton Head Island Resort
Hotels in South Carolina
New Classical architecture
Resorts in South Carolina
Tourist attractions in Beaufort County, South Carolina